Chris Okoh (born 8 April 1969) is a former British cruiserweight boxer.

Biography

Background
Okoh was born in Croydon, to Gloria Okoh. His father died whilst he was still a child.

Boxing career
Okoh's professional boxing record stands at 14 wins, seven by way of knock-out and two losses in 16 bouts. He is the former BBBofC Southern Area and Commonwealth title holder at cruiserweight.

After boxing
Okoh studied to work with rehabilitating offenders and probation in 2002. He is also a trainer at Chadwell St Mary Amateur Boxing Club in Chadwell St Mary, Thurrock, Essex.

Professional boxing record

References

External links
 
 Chris Okoh profile at BritishBoxing.net

1969 births
Living people
English male boxers
Cruiserweight boxers
People from Carshalton
People from Croydon
People from Chadwell St Mary
Commonwealth Boxing Council champions
Boxers from Greater London